The following is a list of Malayalam films released in 1964.

1964
Malayalam
 Mal
 1964
1964 in Indian cinema